Blayne Chanlar Enlow (born March 21, 1999) is an American professional baseball pitcher in the Minnesota Twins organization.

Amateur career
Enlow attended St. Amant High School in Ascension Parish, Louisiana. Before his sophomore year of high school, he broke an ankle and his pelvis in a car accident. He returned to play baseball in his junior year. During his senior year, he played for the USA Baseball 18-and-under team. He committed to attend Louisiana State University (LSU) to play college baseball for the LSU Tigers.

Professional career
The Minnesota Twins selected Enlow in the third round, with the 76th overall selection, of the 2017 Major League Baseball draft. He signed with the Twins, receiving a $2 million signing bonus, and was assigned to the Gulf Coast Twins of the Rookie-level Gulf Coast League. He spent all of his first professional season with in the GCL, posting a 3–0 record with a 1.33 ERA in  innings. He spent 2018 with the Cedar Rapids Kernels of the Class A Midwest League, going 3–5 with a 3.26 ERA over twenty games (17 starts).

Enlow returned to Cedar Rapids to begin 2019 and was promoted to the Fort Myers Miracle of the Class A-Advanced Florida State League in May. Over 21 games (twenty starts) between the two clubs, Enlow went 8–7 with a 3.82 ERA and 95 strikeouts over  innings. Following the cancellation of the 2020 season due to the COVID-19 pandemic, he returned to Cedar Rapids (now members of the High-A Central to begin the 2021 season. He made three starts before it was announced he would be undergoing Tommy John surgery, thus ending his season.

On November 19, 2021, the Twins selected Enlow's contract and added him to their 40-man roster. Enlow returned to action in 2022, spending the majority of the season with the Double-A Wichita Wind Surge. In 24 appearances for Wichita, he posted a 1–3 record and 4.40 ERA with 3 saves and 64 strikeouts in 57.1 innings pitched. On January 6, 2023, Enlow was designated for assignment by the Twins following the waiver claim of Oliver Ortega. On January 13, he was outrighted to Double-A Wichita.

References

External links

1999 births
Living people
People from Ascension Parish, Louisiana
Baseball players from Louisiana
Baseball pitchers
Gulf Coast Twins players
Cedar Rapids Kernels players
Fort Myers Miracle players